Old Coptic is the earliest stage of Coptic writing, a form of late Egyptian written in Coptic script, a variant of the Greek alphabet. It "is an analytical category … utilised by scholars to refer to a particular group of sources" and not a language, dialect or singular writing system. Scholars differ on the exact boundaries of the Old Coptic corpus and thus on the definition of "Old Coptic". Generally, it can be said that Old Coptic texts use more letters of Demotic derivation than later literary Coptic. They lack the consistent script style and borrowed Greek vocabulary of later Coptic literature. Some even use exclusively Greek letters. Moreover, they are generally or exclusively of Egyptian pagan origin, as opposed to later literary Coptic texts, which are strongly associated with Coptic Christianity and to a lesser extent Gnosticism and Manichaeism.

The earliest surviving examples of Egyptian words transliterated in Greek script date to the 6th century BC. Whole Egyptian phrases appear in Greek script from the 3rd century BC.  The earliest Coptic text known is from the 1st century AD. The earliest stage of experimentation with the Egyptian language in the Greek alphabet is sometimes called Pre-Old Coptic or Graeco-Egyptian. Other authors distinguish between early and late Old Coptic. The production of pagan magical texts written in Egyptian in Greek letters continued into the 4th or 5th century, after the start of Coptic literature proper.

Notes

Bibliography

External links
The Coptic Magical Papyri: Vernacular Religion in Late Roman and Early Islamic Egypt

Coptic language